Royal Air Force Peterhead or more simply RAF Peterhead is a former Royal Air Force sector station located  east of Longside, Aberdeenshire and  west of Peterhead, Aberdeenshire, Scotland.

History
The airfield was built in 1941 and disbanded in 1945. During this period there were up to 2,000 RAF personnel based there, including around 250 WAAFs. A large number of RAF squadrons from a variety of nations used RAF Peterhead's five accommodation camps.

In November 1941 the station was hit by two bombs from a Junkers Ju 88 bomber, killing one person and injuring three others. Hawker Hurricane, Supermarine Spitfire and North American Mustang aircraft flew from Longside airfield to provide protection for eastern convoys.

During the 1990s, the airfield site was inspected and aerial photographs were taken as part of an assessment for a proposed pipeline running between St Fergus and Peterhead Power Station. These reports and photographs showed that pillboxes and many buildings still survived, although most of the land had by then returned to agricultural use. The control tower had been demolished. In November 2004, further investigation was undertaken. The report compared photographs from 1946, which showed the airfield and all its ancillary buildings, with photographs taken in June 1969. By then the hangars had been removed but many other buildings and pillboxes still survived.

Squadrons

Other units
 Satellite of No. 2 Flying Instructors School RAF (1943)
 No. 14 Fighter Command Servicing Unit
 No. 1479 (Anti-Aircraft Co-operation) Flight RAF (May 1942 - December 1943)
 No. 1491 (Fighter) Gunnery Flight RAF (October 1943)
 No. 2792 Squadron RAF Regiment
 No. 2803 Squadron RAF Regiment
 No. 2848 Squadron RAF Regiment

Current use
The north-eastern section of the airfield has been taken over by Bond Helicopters and Bristows as a refuelling point for helicopters servicing North Sea oil platforms, roughly a 45-minute flight.

In 2003, after funds were successfully raised by the local branch of the Longside British Legion, a cairn monument was erected in memory of those who had served at RAF Peterhead, Longside airfield. At the time of the unveiling ceremony of the monument on 14 September 2003, there was a flypast from a Douglas Dakota of the Battle of Britain Memorial Flight.

More recently a stretch of the runway is used for flying radio controlled model aircraft.

See also
 List of former Royal Air Force stations

References

Citations

Bibliography

External links
 Derelict Places – RAF Peterhead

Royal Air Force stations in Scotland
Royal Air Force stations of World War II in the United Kingdom
RAF
Transport in Peterhead
Airports established in 1941